Blue Bonnet is an American brand of margarine and other bread spreads and baking fats, owned by ConAgra Foods. Original owner Standard Brands merged with Nabisco in July 1981, but Nabisco ultimately sold Blue Bonnet to ConAgra, along with a number of other food brands, in 1998.

The words to their slogan and jingle are: "Everything's better with Blue Bonnet on it!" A common phrase citing this brand of margarine includes "I'm on it like Blue Bonnet!" indicating the individual is in control of the circumstance.

References

External links
Blue Bonnet website

Margarine brands
Products introduced in 1927
Conagra Brands brands